Remmy Kajoba is a Zambian police officer. On 29 August 2021, newly elected President Hakainde Hichilema appointed him Inspector General of Police. Kajoba has also held the office of Muchinga Province Police Commissioner.

See also
 Kakoma Kanganja

References

Zambian law enforcement officials
Living people
Year of birth missing (living people)